Leigh Ann Ganzar (born September 8, 1989) is an American professional racing cyclist, who currently rides for UCI Women's Continental Team .

References

External links
 

1989 births
Living people
American female cyclists
Place of birth missing (living people)
21st-century American women